Rufus Jones (born 17 May 1975) is an English actor.

Early life
Jones was born in London, and educated at Latymer Upper School and the University of Cambridge, where he studied English.

Career
Jones began his career as one fifth of the comedy group Dutch Elm Conservatoire.

On television, he is known for playing Doctor Foggerty in Julia Davis's award-winning dark comedy Hunderby, producer David Wilkes in W1A, and Miles Mollison in the BBC television mini series The Casual Vacancy. He also played Terry Jones in the BBC Four BAFTA-nominated Holy Flying Circus, Cosmo in comedy-drama Stag, and Tom in Julia Davis's Camping. In 2006, Jones appeared as the journalist in series 2 episode 3 of the BBC comedy Extras.

Other credits include Mongrels (in which he voiced Nelson The Fox), William & Sinclair for Sky Atlantic's Common Ground season, Episodes, It's Kevin, The Wrong Mans, Fresh Meat (series 2), Toast of London, House of Fools, Extras, Lead Balloon, Peep Show, Crooked House, The Increasingly Poor Decisions of Todd Margaret, Love Soup, Katy Brand's Big Ass Show, Green Green Grass, My Family, Losing It, Secret Smile, White Teeth, and Edge of Heaven. In 2011, Jones starred in the one-off BBC Christmas show Lapland.

His 2013 role as Nick Edwards, the slimy opposing candidate to Bob Servant, brought him recognition in the cult BBC Four Neil Forsyth comedy Bob Servant.

Jones has written for Angelos Epithemiou, Mitchell & Webb, the MTV series Fur TV, Jon Culshaw and many others. He was script consultant on E4's Cardinal Burns.

He portrays entrepreneur James Reed in the reed.co.uk adverts.

As a voiceover artist, Jones has worked on numerous commercials, as well as games such as Fable III, Killzone and Xenoblade Chronicles. In 2016, he joined the voice cast of Thomas & Friends, as the voice of Flying Scotsman. Most recently, he has voiced Vermis in Robozuna for ITV/Netflix, various characters in Sadie Sparks for Disney, Constantin in 101 Dalmatian Street for Disney, and is the narrator for the Little Princess.

In 2016, he played Coulson in the BAFTA nominated psychological thriller The Ghoul (directed by Gareth Tunley), and starred as Richard in the West End production of Dead Funny at the Vaudeville Theatre in London.

More recent film work includes Paddington and Woody in The Foreigner with Jackie Chan and Pierce Brosnan. He also played Bernard Delfont in Stan & Ollie with Steve Coogan and John C. Reilly, released in January 2019.

In 2018, Jones starred with Anna Paquin in Flack for Pop/W channel, released in February 2019. He also filmed Home, a 6 part series for Channel 4, that he also wrote, which began airing in March 2019. A second series was broadcast in February and March 2020.

Awards and nominations
In 2005, Jones was nominated for the Perrier Award with sketch group Dutch Elm Conservatoire.

Other work
Rufus has appeared on a number of podcasts including The QuaranTea Break Podcast with Simon Ward, Box of Delights, Rule Of Three and the Pilot TV Podcast.

Filmography

Film

Television

Video games

References

External links

Living people
1975 births
20th-century English male actors
21st-century English male actors
Alumni of the University of Cambridge
English male comedians
English male film actors
English male television actors
English male voice actors
Male actors from London
People educated at Latymer Upper School